French Connection is a French-language greatest hits album by Belgian singer Kate Ryan released under ARS Entertainment.  The album was released in Canada on October 13, 2009, before being released in Ryan's native country of Belgium on October 23, 2009. The album's lead single, "Babacar", was released June 12, 2009 in Belgium.

This compilation includes all of her French greatest hits, as well as covers (both previously released and unreleased), French singles, French versions of some of her English-language songs, and some new versions of her first hits.

Track listing

(*)Although it's a new version, the covers don't mention that is a new version instead of the original mix or the 2002 Radio Edit.

iTunes Bonus Track:
17. "Voyage Voyage" (Acoustic Version) - 3:05

Limited Edition:
CD1 - Includes the 16 standard tracks as above.
CD2:
 "Ella elle l'a" (UK Extended)
 "Babacar" (X-Team Remix)
 "I Surrender" (PF Pumping Radio Edit)
 "L.I.L.Y." (Extended)
 "Megamix" (Containing "Voyage Voyage", "Ella elle l'a", "I Surrender", "Your Eyes")

Personnel 
Katrien Verbeeck a.k.a. Kate Ryan - vocals, lyricist
Niklas Bergwall - producer, composer, lyricist, mixing
Niclas Kings - producer, composer, mixing
Andy Janssens a.k.a. AJ Duncan - producer, composer
Phil Wilde - producer, composer
Yves Gaillard a.k.a. Yves Jongen - producer, mastering
Danny Corten - producer
Mark Carpentier - producer
Antonio "Toni" Ten - producer, lyricist
Francisco "Xasqui" Ten - producer
Ivan Ten - producer
Filip Heurckmans - mastering
Thierry Bidjeck - French translations ("Mon cœur résiste encore")
Jo Lemaire - French translations ("La Promesse", "Tes Yeux")
Jeanette Olsson - backing vocals, lyricist
Jordi Campoy - lyricist

Release history

Charts

References

External links

 Official Web site

Kate Ryan albums
2009 greatest hits albums
French-language compilation albums
2009 remix albums
Concept albums